The 1964 SMU Mustangs football team represented Southern Methodist University (SMU) as a member of the Southwest Conference (SWC) during the 1964 NCAA University Division football season. Led by third-year head coach Hayden Fry, the Mustangs compiled an overall record of 1–9 with a conference mark of 0–7, placing last out of eight teams in the SWC.

Schedule

References

SMU
SMU Mustangs football seasons
SMU Mustangs football